The 2020 Big Ten Conference Men's Ice Hockey Tournament was the seventh tournament in conference history. It was scheduled to be played between March 6 and March 21, 2020, on-campus locations. On March 12, 2020, the Big Ten announced that the tournament was canceled due to the coronavirus pandemic.

Format
The tournament featured a format with all games taking place on the campus of the higher-seeded teams. The tournament opened with three best-of-three quarterfinal series, as the second, third and fourth-seeded teams each hosting a series. The top-seeded team had a bye to the single-elimination semifinals. The highest-seeded team remaining after the semifinals was intended to host the championship game.

Conference standings

Bracket
Teams were reseeded for the semifinals

Note: * denotes overtime periods.

Results

Quarterfinals

(2) Ohio State vs. (7) Wisconsin

(3) Michigan vs. (6) Michigan State

(4) Minnesota vs. (5) Notre Dame

References

Big Ten Men's Ice Hockey Tournament
Big Ten Men's Ice Hockey Tournament
Big Ten Men's Ice Hockey Tournament